Anastasia Gennadyevna Vasina (born 18 December 1987) is a Russian beach volleyball player. As of 2012, she plays with Anna Vozakova. They competed at the 2012 Summer Olympics in London. They are the first representatives of Russia in beach volleyball competing in the Olympics. In the first round of the games, the Russians pulled an upset against the match favorites Xue Chen and Zhang Xi from China and qualified to the next round as first in their group but were eliminated by the Austrian team in the round of 16. Vasina currently plays with Alexandra Moiseeva.

References

External links
 
 
 
 

1987 births
Russian beach volleyball players
Living people
Beach volleyball players at the 2012 Summer Olympics
Olympic beach volleyball players of Russia
People from Serpukhov
Sportspeople from Moscow Oblast
20th-century Russian women
21st-century Russian women